Fall Guy is a 1947 American crime film noir directed by Reginald Le Borg.  The drama features Leo Penn, Robert Armstrong and Teala Loring.  The film is based on Cornell Woolrich's short story, "Cocaine."

Plot
With no memory of the night in question and a few clues, a man tries to prove he did not murder an attractive woman. Tom Cochrane, high on cocaine and covered with blood, is picked up by the police and then questioned by detectives Shannon (Douglas Fowley) and Taylor (Harry Strang), but manages to escape. His girlfriend Lois Walter (Teala Loring), against the wishes of her guardian, Jim Grosset (Charles Arnt), assists Tom and his police-officer brother-in-law Mac (Robert Armstrong) in trying to clear Tom of a possible murder charge. Tom only recalls meeting a man in a bar and going to a party. Tom and Mac find the man, Joe (Elisha Cook Jr.), who takes them to the party scene, the apartment of the Shindells (John Harmon and Iris Adrian), where they find the body of a murdered girl in the apartment above. The police pick up Mac, while Tom trails Marie (Virginia Dale) and Mike (Jack Overman). Joe is murdered for leading Tom to the scene of the crime, and Marie, who had been hired by the killer to get Tom at the apartment when the crime was committed, is choked to death. Tom, following the killer of Marie, is almost trapped and killed himself, but is saved by Mike.

Cast
 Leo Penn as Tom Cochrane (billed as Clifford Penn)
 Robert Armstrong as Mac McLaine
 Teala Loring as Lois Walter
 Elisha Cook Jr. as Joe
 Douglas Fowley as Inspector Shannon
 Charles Arnt as Uncle Jim Grossett
 Virginia Dale as Marie
 Iris Adrian as Mrs. Sindell

Reception
TV Guide has rated it 2/4 stars.

References

Further reading
 

1947 films
1947 crime drama films
1940s crime thriller films
American crime drama films
American crime thriller films
American black-and-white films
Film noir
Monogram Pictures films
Films based on short fiction
Films based on works by Cornell Woolrich
Films directed by Reginald Le Borg
Films produced by Walter Mirisch
1940s English-language films
1940s American films